Kinking hair, or acquired progressive kinking, is a skin condition primarily reposted in postpubescent males with androgenetic alopecia, presenting with gradual curling and darkening of the frontal, temporal, auricular, and vertex hairs which, under the microscope, show kinks and twists with or without longitudinal grooving.

See also 
 List of cutaneous conditions

References

Conditions of the skin appendages
Human hair
Hair diseases